Krstenica is a small settlement on the right bank of the Soča River between Kanal and Anhovo in the Littoral region of Slovenia. Until 2007, the area was part of the settlement of Gorenja Vas.

The local church is dedicated to Saint Nicholas and belongs to the parish of Kanal.

References

External links
Krstenica on Geopedia

Populated places in the Municipality of Kanal